Saharanpur is a city and a municipal corporation in Uttar Pradesh, India. It is also the administrative headquarters of Saharanpur district.

Saharanpur city's name was given after the Saint Shah Haroon Chishti.

Saharanpur is declared as one amongst the 100 Smart Cities by MOUD as a part of Smart Cities Mission of the Government of India.

Geography and climate

Saharanpur is a part of a geographical doab region. Saharanpur district join four states together Himachal Pradesh, Uttar Pradesh, Uttarakhand and Haryana.

Demographics

According to the 2011 Indian census, Saharanpur had a population of 705,478, 12.5% of whom were under the age of six, living in 129,856 households within the municipal corporation limits. Saharanpur had a population of 455,754 in 2001 and 374,945 in 1991.

Males constitute of 52.7% of the total population while females constitute of 47.3% of the total population and thus, the city has a sex ratio of 891 females for every 1,000 males. The city has an average literacy rate of 76.32%. Scheduled Castes and Scheduled Tribes account for 14.2% and 0.1% of the population respectively. There are 233,196 people, constituting about 33% of the total population, who live in slums in the city.

Roughly half of the city's population are Hindus, who form a slight majority, while Muslims constitute about forty five percent of the total population. Sikhs and Jains are also present in smaller numbers.

The most widely spoken language in Saharanpur is Hindi, which along with Urdu is the official language of Uttar Pradesh. There are significant numbers of Urdu and Punjabi speakers, while Haryanvi is also spoken by some people. The standard dialect of Hindi spoken is the Khari Boli dialect.

Government and politics 
Saharanpur city is governed by Saharanpur Municipal Corporation, erstwhile Municipal Council. The city is divided into 4 zones and 70 wards, represented by 70 councillors who were elected by municipal or local elections in 2017 for a five-year term. The head of the administrative wing is the Municipal Commissioner, currently Ms.Gazal Bharadwaj while the head of the elected wing is the Mayor Sanjeev Walia from the BJP.

The city is also part of the Saharanpur Lok Sabha constituency, which elected Haji Fazlur Rehman from the Bahujan Samaj Party in 2019 as the Member of Parliament, and part of the Saharanpur Assembly constituency that elected Ashu Malik from the Samajwadi Party in 2022 as the MLA.

Civic utilities 
There is only one sewage treatment plant located in Saharanpur, while most of the waste water is discharged into the Hindon river, further polluting it.

Culture

Places of interest

Company Garden

The Saharanpur Botanical Gardens, known as the Company Garden and once the preserve of British East India Company, is one of the oldest existing gardens in India, dating to before 1750. Then named Farahat-Bakhsh, it was originally a pleasure ground set out by a local chief, Intazam ud-ullah. In 1817, it was acquired by the British East India Company and placed under the authority of the District Surgeon. Joseph Dalton Hooker says of this Botanical Garden that "Amongst its greatest triumphs may be considered the introduction of the tea-plant from China, a fact I allude to, as many of my English readers may not be aware that the establishment of the tea-trade in the Himalaya and Assam is almost entirely the work of the superintendents of the gardens of Calcutta and Seharunpore."

In 1887, when the Botanical Survey of India was set up to reform the country's botanical sciences, Saharanpur became the centre for the survey of the northern Indian flora. The Garden is seen historically as being second only to the Calcutta Gardens for its contribution to science and economy in India. Under private auspices today, it is full of greenery and has many different kinds of plants and flowers.

Shakumbari Devi Temple

Siddhpeeth Shri Shakumbhari Devi Temple is an important and ancient Hindu temple. It is situated in the Shivalik hills in Behat tehsil, 40 km from Saharanpur in Uttar Pradesh. It is one of the most visited pilgrimage centers in India. Every year lakhs of visitors visit the temple. Shakumbhari devi is a famous Shaktipeeth of maa Durga.

Transport 

Two major National Highways pass through Saharanpur — NH 709B and NH 344. The NH 709B originates in Saharanpur and connects it to Delhi via Shamli and Baghpat, while the NH 344 connects Saharanpur with Ambala, Yamunanagar and Roorkee. Uttar Pradesh State Highway 57, commonly known as Delhi-Yamunotri highway, also passes through the city. The Delhi–Saharanpur–Dehradun Expressway has also been proposed, which will be ready by March 2024.

Saharanpur Junction is the primary railway station serving the city. The station is under the administrative control of Ambala railway division of the Northern Railways, and is located at the junction of Moradabad–Ambala line, Delhi–Meerut–Saharanpur line and the Delhi–Shamli–Saharanpur line. Another line connecting Saharanpur with Moradabad was completed in 1886. 

The Shahdara–Saharanpur light railway connecting Shahdara in Delhi with Saharanpur was opened to traffic in 1907. However, due to increasing losses, the railway was closed in 1970. It was later converted to  broad gauge and was repopened in the late 1970s. Saharanpur falls on the route of the proposed  Eastern Dedicated Freight Corridor project.

See also 
 Saharanpuri
 Saharanpur district
 Saharanpur (Lok Sabha constituency)

References

External links

 
Cities and towns in Saharanpur district
Cities in Uttar Pradesh